Holovyn is a village in Rivne Raion, Rivne Oblast, Ukraine, but was formerly administered within Kostopil Raion. As of the year 2001, the community had 1004 residents. The postal code is 35041,  and the KOATUU code is 5623480801.

References

External links 
 Article Hołowin in the Geographical Dictionary of the Kingdom of Poland, Volume III (Haag — Kępy), 1882 year 
 Weather in the Holovyn 

Villages in Rivne Raion